Franco Ezequiel Carboni (born 4 April 2003) is a professional footballer who plays as a left-back or left midfielder for  club Monza, on loan from Inter Milan. Born in Argentina, Carboni represented both Italy and Argentina internationally at youth level.

Club career
Carboni started his career in his native Argentina with Lanús, before leaving for Italy at the age of sixteen, when his father accepted the job of youth coordinator at Catania. He only spent five months with Catania before his performances caught the attention of clubs across Europe. He signed for Inter Milan in January 2020.

He signed a new contract with Inter in April 2022.

On 11 July 2022, Carboni was loaned by Cagliari. On 24 January 2023, he moved to Monza in Serie A on loan until 30 June 2024, with an option to buy for Monza and a counter-option for Inter.

International career
Born in Buenos Aires, Argentina, Carboni is eligible to represent both Italy and Argentina at international level. Having represented the Italy U18 national team in a 3–1 friendly win over Austria in 2021, he switched allegiance to his native Argentina, and was called up to the Argentina national team in 2022.

Style of play
Initially a forward at Lanús, Carboni moved further down the pitch during his time in Italy, and mostly operates as a left wing-back or left midfielder.

Personal life
Franco hails from a footballing family, with father Ezequiel having played for teams in Argentina and Europe. His brother, Valentín, is also a footballer with Inter Milan. Carboni holds both Argentine and Italian passports.

References

2003 births
Living people
Footballers from Buenos Aires
Argentine people of Italian descent
Italian people of Argentine descent
Argentine footballers
Italian footballers
Association football fullbacks
Association football midfielders
Club Atlético Lanús footballers
Catania S.S.D. players
Inter Milan players
Cagliari Calcio players
A.C. Monza players
Serie B players
Serie A players
Italy youth international footballers
Argentina youth international footballers